Patrick Meagher may refer to:
 Patrick Meagher (hurler), Irish hurler
 Patrick Meagher (artist), American artist and art organizer
 Patrick Claiborne Meagher, member of the Mississippi House of Representatives